Eric Katz is a mathematician working in combinatorial algebraic geometry and arithmetic geometry. He is currently an associate professor in the Department of Mathematics at Ohio State University.

In joint work with Karim Adiprasito and June Huh, he resolved the Heron–Rota–Welsh conjecture on the log-concavity of the characteristic polynomial of matroids. With Joseph Rabinoff and David Zureick-Brown, he has given bounds on rational and torsion points on curves.

Education 
Katz went to Beachwood High School, in Beachwood, Ohio, a suburb of Cleveland. After earning a B.S. in Mathematics from Ohio State University in 1999, he pursued graduate studies at Stanford University, obtaining his Ph.D. in 2004 with a thesis written under the direction of Yakov Eliashberg and Ravi Vakil.

References 

Year of birth missing (living people)
1970s births
Living people
Ohio State University faculty
Academic staff of the University of Waterloo
Stanford University alumni
People from Cleveland
Mathematicians from Ohio
Algebraic geometers
Combinatorialists
20th-century American mathematicians
21st-century American mathematicians
Ohio State University College of Arts and Sciences alumni